Pedicularis contorta is a species of flowering plant in the family Orobanchaceae known by the common names coiled lousewort and curved-beak lousewort. It is native to western North America, including southwestern Canada and the northwestern United States, where it grows in moist mountainous habitat, such as bogs, shady forests, and meadows. The inflorescence is a raceme of flowers occupying the top of the stem. Each flower is a centimeter long or slightly longer, white to yellowish in color, and divided into a coiled or curved beak-like upper lip and a flat, three-lobed lower lip. The fruit is a capsule up to a  centimeter long containing seeds with netted surfaces.

References

External links
Jepson Manual Treatment
USDA Plants Profile
Photo gallery
Turner Photographics

contorta
Flora of California
Flora of Oregon
Flora of Washington (state)
Flora of Western Canada
Flora of the Klamath Mountains
Taxa named by George Bentham
Flora without expected TNC conservation status